Hopkins Rides is an amusement ride manufacturer based in Palm City, Florida. The company has had experience in amusement rides for over 45 years and currently specializes in water rides.

History
In 1962 O.D. Hopkins incorporated Hopkins Engineering and started installing ski lifts for J.A. Roebling & Sons of Trenton, New Jersey. In 1965 Hopkins purchased the ski lift division and all the related assets from Roebling & Sons. Soon afterwards a competitor, Universal Design Ltd., discontinued manufacturing Sky Rides, and their customers turned to Hopkins Engineering for parts. Hopkins' first customer in the amusement business was Charles Wood of Storytown USA.

In 1971, the name of the company was changed to O.D. Hopkins Associates Inc. In 1979, Hopkins was approached by Paul Roads, owner of Wonderland Park (Texas), to build a reasonably-priced log flume for his park. The success of that project started Hopkins in the water ride manufacturing business.

In November, 2001, O.D. Hopkins and Associates Inc. filed for bankruptcy protection. The aerial ropeway/sky ride division was spun off to Skyfair, Inc. on January 1, 1986. The company reorganized and emerged as Hopkins Rides, LLC in May 2002, and was for a brief time in partnership with Reverchon Industries of France.

In August 2012 water slide manufacturer WhiteWater West acquired assets and intellectual property from Hopkins Rides, LLC. Although WhiteWater Attractions has adopted the Hopkins Rides technology, it is not a parent company to Hopkins Rides, LLC and the companies operate independently. WhiteWater sells its products under the Water Rides brand.

Manufacturing

The company originally manufactured Sky Rides, but in the 1980s, with the increase in popularity of their water-based attractions, those rides became the company's primary product. In addition to the water-based attractions, Hopkins built seven roller coasters from 1985 to 1996. They also dabbled in other amusement ride types such as a SkyGlider, tube slides and water jet ride known as an Aqua Drag. Santa's Village still operates its SkyGlider, and Wonderland Park still operates its Aqua Drag and SkyGlider in addition to its other Hopkins rides.

Hopkins also re-fabricated portions of track on two Arrow Dynamics-built coasters: Dahlonega Mine Train at Six Flags Over Georgia received 1,400 feet of new track and supports in 1986 and Canobie Corkscrew at Canobie Lake Park received new track and supports in 1990.

The company currently focuses only on water ride attractions:
 Shoot the Chute rides
 Flumes and larger capacity Super Flumes
 River Raft ride
 Water Transportation Systems

List of roller coasters

As of 2019, Hopkins Rides has built 7 roller coasters around the world.

List of other attractions

Flumes
Unless otherwise specified, all flumes feature at least one lift and a drop into a splash pool.

Shoot the Chute rides

River Raft rides

Super Flumes

Notes

References

External links

Amusement ride manufacturers
Roller coaster manufacturers
Manufacturing companies based in Florida
Entertainment companies established in 1962
Manufacturing companies established in 1962